was an anime and film editor and director.  Okayasu was nominated for two Japanese Academy Awards: in 1997 for The Eel and in 1998 for Dr. Akagi, both for Best Editor.

Works
All credits are as an editor unless otherwise indicated.
Anime

TV
21-emon
The Adventures of Piccolino
High School! Kimengumi
Magic Knight Rayearth (both seasons)
Ulysses 31
Umeboshi Denka

OVAs
Fatal Fury 2: The New Battle
Rayearth

Films
21-emon: Uchū Ike! Hadashi no Princess (1992-03-07)
The Story of Perrine: The Movie (1990-6-30, organization director)
3000 Leagues in Search of Mother (1980-07-19, organization director)
The Adventures of Piccolino
Captain Tsubasa
Ashita no Mukatte Hashire! (1986-03-15)
Ayaushi! Zen Nippon Jr. (1985-12-21)
Europe Daikessen (1985-07-13)
Sekai Daikessen!! Jr. World Cup (1986-07-12)
Crayon Shin-chan
Action Mask vs. Leotard Devil (1993-07-24)
The Hidden Treasure of the Buri Buri Kingdom (1994-04-23)
Unkokusai's Ambition (1995-04-15)
Great Adventure in Henderland (1996-04-19)
Pursuit of the Balls of Darkness (1997-04-19)
Blitzkrieg! Pig's Hoof's Secret Mission (1998-04-18)
Explosion! The Hot Spring's Feel Good Final Battle (1999-04-17)
CrayShin Paradise: Made in Saitama (1999-04-17)
Jungle That Invites Storm (2000-04-22)
The Adult Empire Strikes Back (2001-04-21)
The Battle of the Warring States (2002-04-20)
The Kasukabe Boys of the Evening Sun (2004-04-17)
Dohyō no Oni-tachi (1994-05-21)
Dokaben (1977-03-19)
Kōshien e no Michi (1977-07-17)
Doraemon
2112: The Birth of Doraemon (1995-03-04)
The Day When I Was Born (2002-03-09)
Doraemon Comes Back (1998-03-07)
Ganbare! Gian!! (2001-03-10)
Doraemon: A Grandmother's Recollections (2000-03-04)
Nobita and the Legend of the Sun King (2000-03-04)
Nobita and the Mysterious Wind Masters (2003-03-08)
Nobita and the Robot Kingdom (2002-03-09)
Doraemon: Nobita and the Winged Braves (2001-03-10)
Nobita's Adventure in Clockwork City (1997-04-19)
Doraemon: Nobita Drifts in the Universe (1999-03-06)
Nobita's Fantastic Three Musketeers (1994-03-12)
Nobita's Galactic Express (1996-03-02)
Doraemon: Nobita's Genesis Diary (1995-03-04)
Doraemon: Nobita's the Night Before a Wedding (1999-03-06)
Nobita's South Sea Adventure (1998-03-07)
Nobita's Wannyan Space-Time Odyssey (2004-03-08)
The Doraemons
Doki Doki Wildcat Engine (2000-03-04)
The Great Operation of Springing Insects (1998-03-07)
The Puzzling Challenge Letter of the Mysterious Thief Dorapan (1997-03-08)
Funny candy of Okashinana!? (1999-03-06)
Dorami-chan
Dorami-chan: A Blue Straw Hat (1994-03-12)
Dorami-chan: Hello, Dynosis Kids!! (1993-03-06)
Dorami-chan: Mini-Dora SOS (1989-03-11)
Dorami-chan: Wow, The Kid Gang of Bandits (1991-03-09)
Dorami & The Doraemons
Robot School's Seven Mysteries (1996-03-02)
Space Land's Critical Event! (2001-03-10)
Elmer's Adventure: My Father's Dragon (1997-07-05)
Esper Mami: Hoshizora no Dancing Doll (1988-03-12)
Fatal Fury: The Motion Picture (1994-07-16)
High School! Kimengumi (1986-07-12)
Ninja Hattori-kun
Ninnin Furusato Taisakusen no Maki (1983-03-12)
Ninnin Ninpō Enikki no Maki (1982-03-13)
Ninja Hattori-kun + Pāman: Chōnōryoku Wars (1984-03-17)
Ninja Hattori-kun + Pāman: Ninja Kaijū Shippō vs Miracle Tamago (1985-03-16)
Obake no Q-tarō
Tobidase! Bake Bake Taisakusen (1986-03-15)
Tobidase!! 1/100 no Taisakusen (1987-03-14)
Pāman
Pa-Pa-Pa the Movie Pāman (2003-03-08)
Pa-Pa-Pa the Movie Pāman: Tako de Pon! Ashi wa Pon! (2004-03-08)
Pro Golfer Saru
Kōga Hikyō! Kage no Ninpō Golfer Sanjō! (1987-03-14)
Super Golf World e no Chōsen!! (1986-03-15)
Taiyō no Ko: Deta no Fua (1980-09-13)
Ultra B: Black Hole kara no Dokusaisha B•B (1988-03-12)
Umeboshi Denka: Uchū no Hate kara Panparopan! (1994-03-12)
Yakyū-kyō no Uta: Kita no Ōkami, Minami no Tora (1979-09-15)
YuYu Hakusho: Meikai Shitōhen: Honō no Kizuna (1994-04-09)
Live action
Aitsu ni Koishite (1987-05-30)
Ao no Shunkan (2001-05-19)
Arashi no Kisetsu: The Young Blood Typhoon (1995-05-13)
The Audition (1984-11-17)
The Ballad of Narayama (1983-04-29)
Black Rain (1989-05-13)
Chinpui: Eri-sama Katsudō Daishashin (1990-03-10)
Daiōjō (1998-10-10)
Danchi Tsuma: Hiru Kudari no Yūwaku (1974-01-15)
Dr. Akagi (1998-10-17)
Eros + Gyakusatsu (1970)
Fukumoto Kōhei Kaku Hashiriki (1992-08-08)
Fukashigi Monogatari: 2-to Shiseikatsu Catalog (1988-02-27)
Fukashigi Monogatari: 6 Katei (1988-02-27)
Hi wa Ikiteita (1975)
Hiru Kudari no Jōji: Henshin (1973-01-24)
James-yama no Riran (1992-02-15)
Joshi Daisei Sex Kaki Seminar (1973-08-04)
Koi-gurui (1971-12-01)
Kuroi Ame ni Utarete (1984-08-12)
Last Frankestein (1991-04-20)
Maruhi Gokuraku Beni Benten (1973-08-25)
Maruhi Jorō Zangoku Iro Jigoku (1973-10-24)
Nakibokuro (1991-09-28)
Ningen Jōhatsu (1967)
Rasen no Sobyō (1991-06-22)
Rengoku Eroica (1971)
Ryūji (2002-03-02)
Shikidō Kōza: Nozoki Senka (1973-04-25)
Shīkyatto (1988)
Shiroi Shōfu: Kashin no Takamari (1974-03-02)
Shokugyōbetsu Sex Kōryakuhō (1973-03-24)
Sukeban Deka: Dirty Marie (1974-04-20)
Taiyō no Ko (1974)
Tengoku made no Hyaku Mile (2000-11-15)
The Eel (1997-05-24)
Uresugita Chibusa: Hitozuma (1973-02-03)
Wakare Klaus #1 (1978-07-15)
Warm Water Under a Red Bridge (2001-11-03)
Watashi wa Suteta Onna (1968)
Winds of God (1995-06-03)
Yakuza Kwannon: Jōjo Jingi (1973-07-14)
Yuriko Kara no Tegami (1981-06-22)
Zegen (1987-09-05)

References

External links
 Japan Movie Database
 AllCinema Online
 
 Japanese Movie and Television Editing Association

1936 births
2014 deaths
Anime industry
Japanese film editors